Eduard Eugen Blösch (1 February 1807, Biel/Bienne – 7 February 1866) was a Swiss politician, President of the Federal Supreme Court (1855 and 1863) and President of the Swiss National Council (1855/1856).

References

External links 
 
 
 
 

1807 births
1866 deaths
People from Biel/Bienne
Swiss Calvinist and Reformed Christians
Members of the Council of States (Switzerland)
Members of the National Council (Switzerland)
Presidents of the National Council (Switzerland)